Reha Kapsal (born 11 April 1963 in Diyarbakır) is a Turkish football manager. He is a widely known head coach and manager in Turkish Süper Lig and 1. Lig for his training sessions and tactical point of view.
He was also a footballer, and played as a striker.

Kapsal played for Diyarbakırspor, Altay, Trabzonspor (1989–1990), Zeytinburnuspor (1994–1997) and Malatya Belediyespor (1997–1998). 

He managed Marmaris Belediyespor, Vestel Manisaspor, Kayserispor, Ankaraspor, Ankaragücü, Karşıyaka, Şanlıurfaspor and the Turkish U-21 National team.

References

External links
Coach profile at TFF

1963 births
Living people
Sportspeople from Diyarbakır
Diyarbakırspor footballers
Altay S.K. footballers
Trabzonspor footballers
Zeytinburnuspor footballers
Turkish football managers
Turkish footballers
Karşıyaka S.K. managers
Yeni Malatyaspor footballers

Association football forwards